Yi Qi may refer to:

 伊祁 (pinyin: yī qí), the ancestral name of Emperor Yao, a legendary Chinese ruler
 Yi (dinosaur) (奇翼), a monotypic genus whose sole species is Yi qi. It means "strange wing". It had long fingers. Paleontologists believe that these dinosaurs had stretches of skin between their fingers that enabled them to glide. They belong to the scansoriopterygidae family. 
 一汽, a Chinese abbreviation for FAW Group Corporation